Kobayashi Eitaku (22 April 1843 – 27 May 1890) was a Japanese artist and illustrator specializing in ukiyo-e and nihonga.

Biography
Eitaku was born 22 April 1843, a third son of Miura Kichisaburo. At the age of 12 or 13 he became an apprentice under the Kanō school painter Kanō Eishin. Few years later he started to work for Ii Naosuke of Ii clan in Hikone as an official painter, he was given a samurai status. Ii Naosuke was assassinated in 1860, after that Eitaku started travel through the country, and then settled in Nihonbashi.

After he left the Kanō school to produce ukiyo-e, it is said that the ukiyo-e painter Kawanabe Kyōsai took care of him. He studied different styles of painting, both Ming and Western; he studied ukiyo-e with Yoshitoshi and started to produce colourful prints after c. 1870. he also worked as an illustrator for the Yokohama mainichi shimbun newspaper, and created illustration for books.

Eitaku's work long suffered the same low critical esteem in Japan as that of his contemporary, late-era ukiyo-e artists. It was valued more highly in the West—his painting Sugawara Michizane Praying on Tenpai-zan (1880) won a place in the Museum of Fine Arts, Boston.

Gallery

References

Works cited

External links

 Eitaku prints at ukiyo-e.org
 Lambiek Comiclopedia page

1843 births
1890 deaths
19th-century Japanese painters
Ukiyo-e artists
Nihonga painters
Japanese illustrators